Christian Marcelo "Chelly" Arrue (born 8 January 1969) is an American cyclist. He competed at the 2000 Summer Olympics in Sydney, in the men's sprint and Men's keirin. Arrue was born in Santiago, Chile. He became an American citizen in 1996.

References

External links

1969 births
Living people
American male cyclists
Olympic cyclists of the United States
Cyclists at the 2000 Summer Olympics
Sportspeople from Santiago
Pan American Games medalists in cycling
Pan American Games silver medalists for Chile
Pan American Games gold medalists for the United States
Pan American Games silver medalists for the United States
Cyclists at the 1995 Pan American Games
Cyclists at the 1999 Pan American Games